Casper Ruud defeated the defending champion Diego Schwartzman in the final, 5–7, 6–2, 6–3 to win the singles title at the 2022 Argentina Open.

Seeds
The top four seeds received a bye into the second round.

Draw

Finals

Top half

Bottom half

Qualifying

Seeds

Qualifiers

Qualifying draw

First qualifier

Second qualifier

Third qualifier

Fourth qualifier

References

External links
Main draw
Qualifying draw

Argentina Open - Singles
ATP Buenos Aires